LaMont Smith (born December 11, 1972) is a former 1996 Olympic Games gold medalist in the men's 4x400 meter relay for the United States.

Raised in Willingboro Township, New Jersey, Smith is a graduate of Willingboro High School, the same school as Carl Lewis, who also won a gold medal at the same Olympics.  While at Willingboro, Smith won nine state championships. He attended Blinn College, where he was a 4 time NJCAA national champion. A decade younger than Lewis, Smith joined Lewis on the Santa Monica Track Club.  Lamont became a member of Phi Beta Sigma fraternity in 1996.

References

 

1972 births
African-American male track and field athletes
Living people
American male sprinters
Athletes (track and field) at the 1996 Summer Olympics
Olympic gold medalists for the United States in track and field
Junior college men's track and field athletes in the United States
Medalists at the 1996 Summer Olympics
People from Willingboro Township, New Jersey
Sportspeople from Burlington County, New Jersey
Track and field athletes from New Jersey
Willingboro High School alumni
21st-century African-American sportspeople
20th-century African-American sportspeople